Big Brother 3, also known as Big Brother: Anders, was the third season of the Belgian version of Big Brother aired in the Flemish Region of Belgium on Kanaal 2. The show started on 1 September 2002 and finished on 15 December 2002 with a total duration of 106 days. Kelly Vandevenne won €33,099.

This season had a unique concept. In comparison with previous seasons, the house was very luxurious, each housemate had its own budget and tasks were diverse in time and place (since there were outdoor tasks). Big Brother also added a mole. Halfway through the season, the nomination system was changed. 14 housemates participated this season, only one housemate was removed.

The live shows got less ratings than previous seasons. The highlights shows often got more than 500,000 views. 892,000 viewers watched the final. Producers called it their best season yet. The fourth season was announced during the final.

Format
This season had a completely different format as the previous first and second season. Abandoning the Back to Basics concept, the house became much more luxurious. The interior was reshaped by interior specialist Erik Vernieuwe. The garden was covered but a Jacuzzi, tanning bed and fitness equipment were added.

The producers wanted a unique format for Flanders. The tag line of the season was Vergeet wat je weet (Forget everything you know), adding the subtitle anders (lit. different).

There were many differences:
 No losers:  There wasn't only one winner. Each housemate had their own budget. The remaining budget was given to the housemate when they evicted.
 No isolation:  There were VIP guests during the Saturday live stream and there were also outdoor tasks.
 No trust:  Big Brother had a mole in the house who had a secret identity and secret missions.
 Tasks:  No weekly tasks anymore but tasks of one or more days. Tasks could be individual or in group or for all housemates. The results of the tasks weren't for the group budget (that didn't exist anymore) but for the individual of the participating housemates.
 Halfway through the season, the nomination system changed. The audience made their nomination and the remaining housemates evicted one of the nominated housemates.

Housemates

Weekly summary

Nominations table

Notes

External links
 World of Big Brother

References

03
2002 television seasons